HMCS Stadacona was a commissioned patrol boat of the Royal Canadian Navy (RCN) that served in the First World War and postwar until 1920. Prior to entering service with the RCN, the vessel was the private yacht Columbia. Following the war, Stadacona performed hydrographic surveys. The vessel was sold for commercial use in 1920 and was burned for salvage in 1948. Stadacona is a historic name associated with Canada, the voyages Jacques Cartier, the colony of Samuel de Champlain, and Quebec City.

Origins
The vessel was built by Crescent Shipyard, Elizabeth, New Jersey as the American steam yacht Columbia, the second yacht of that name built for J. Harvey Ladew of New York, and modeled on the United States Coast Survey steamer  that had been built in the same yard.

She was acquired by Aemilius Jarvis on behalf of the RCN in July 1915 along with the yacht Waterus from the New York shipbrokers Cox and Stevens for $155,000. (The sales were blocked by the then-neutral U.S. government, and prolific champion yachtsman Commodore Jarvis subsequently had to sneak the ships from the U.S. to Canada.) Columbia was renamed Stadacona, after a small Iroquois village which had previously occupied the site of Quebec City.

Canadian service
Stadacona was one of a number of American private yachts acquired by the RCN during the First World War. The vessel was commissioned into the RCN on 13 August 1915. Stadacona was then sent to the Canadian Vickers shipyard in Montreal, Quebec to fit out. The vessel was given one  gun forward and a 12-pounder gun was added aft later in the war. The vessel then sailed to Sydney, Nova Scotia to begin her career as a patrol vessel in September. In 1916 Stadacona was among the vessels assigned to patrol the Cabot Strait. The vessel became flagship of the Canada's East Coast fleet based at Halifax under Vice Admiral Sir Charles Coke on 30 April 1916. Stadacona remained flagship of the fleet after Walter Hose took over command from Sir Charles Coke on 14 August. In August 1918 the German U-boat  captured the fishing trawler Triumph off the East Coast of Canada. Using the trawler to get close to the Atlantic fishing fleets, the Germans sank several Canadian and American fishing trawlers. Stadacona was among the vessels dispatched to deal with the submarine. However, the Germans scuttled Triumph once the fishing trawler ran out of fuel.

In early 1919 Stadacona, accompanied by a number of s, was sent to the west coast via the Panama Canal. She served as a dispatch vessel until being paid off on 31 March 1920, and transferred to government service. The vessel was then used primarily used for hydrographic surveys and occasionally for fisheries patrol along the west coast until sold in 1924.

Sale and subsequent career
Sold in 1924, Stadacona became the West Coast rum running depot ship Kuyakuzmt during Prohibition before being rebuilt in 1929 at Vancouver as the yacht Lady Stimson. In 1931 the yacht was converted to a tugboat and renamed Moonlight Maid. During World War II the tugboat was acquired by the United States Army and converted to a cargo vessel in 1942 and operated as the coastal freighter, U.S. Army FS-539. In 1948, she was burned for salvage at Seattle, Washington and broken up by Foss Launch & Tug Co.

See also
 HMCS Stadacona was also the name of an RCN shore establishment in Halifax, Nova Scotia.

Footnotes

References

Bibliography

External links
 Converted civilian vessels
 Canadian Navy Heritage Project: Ship Technical Information
 Canadian Navy Heritage Project: Photo Archive

1899 ships
Armed yachts of the Royal Canadian Navy
Ships of the United States Army
Auxiliary ships of the Royal Canadian Navy